Naser Al Sebai (born 14 May 1985) is a Syrian footballer. He currently plays for Putra Samarinda as a defender.

Club career

Al-Karamah
Al Sebai signed for Al-Karamah as a youth team player in 2005 and rose through the club's youth sides.

Tripoli SC
In 2011, he joined Lebanese Premier League club Tripoli SC. He played in 22 games with the club.

Persib Bandung
In November 2012 he officially joined Persib Bandung after signing a contract duration of one year on 28 November 2012. After officially signing a contract duration of one season, he was determined to spill all his ability to Persib, in competition 2013 Indonesia Super League. "I'm so happy to finally be joining Persib. Since the beginning of coming to Indonesia, I really want to play here (Persib). Even when I follow the selection with Arema, it still wants to Persib. Thank God finally answered," Naser said, after signing the contract.

Churchill Brothers
On 21 November 2013, Naser signed for Churchill Brothers for a one-year deal.

Honour and titles

Club
Al-Karamah
Syrian Premier League (4 titles): 2006, 2007, 2008, 2009
Syrian Cup (4 titles): 2007, 2008, 2009, 2010
Syrian Super Cup (1 title): 2008
AFC Champions League: 2006 Runner-up
AFC Cup: 2009 Runner-up

References

External links
 Al Sebai at alkarameh.com (Arabic)
 Career stats at Kooora.com (Arabic)
 

1985 births
Living people
Sportspeople from Homs
Syrian footballers
Syrian expatriate footballers
Syrian expatriate sportspeople in Indonesia
Expatriate footballers in Lebanon
Expatriate footballers in Indonesia
Syrian expatriate sportspeople in Lebanon
Al-Karamah players
Persib Bandung players
Association football defenders
Syrian Premier League players
AC Tripoli players
Lebanese Premier League players
Churchill Brothers FC Goa players